Jane Rigby is a Zimbabwean international lawn bowler.

Bowls career
Rigby has represented Zimbabwe at the Commonwealth Games, in the singles event at the 2002 Commonwealth Games.

She won the silver medal at the 2012 World Singles Champion of Champions in Paphos, Cyprus.

References

Living people
Bowls players at the 2002 Commonwealth Games
Zimbabwean female bowls players
Year of birth missing (living people)